is a former Japanese football player.

Playing career
Kobayashi was born in Tokai, Ibaraki on June 20, 1979. After graduating from Komazawa University, he joined J1 League club JEF United Ichihara in 2002. However he could not play at all in the match. In August 2003, he moved to J2 League club Montedio Yamagata. He became a regular player as center back in October. In 2004, he played all 43 matches except 1 match for suspension as center back with Leonardo. However his opportunity to play decreased behind Shogo Kobara. In 2006, he moved to J2 club Vissel Kobe. Although Vissel was promoted to J1 end of 2006 season, he could not play many matches. In 2008, he became a regular center back. However his opportunity to play decreased from 2009. In 2011, he moved to Ventforet Kofu. In 2012, he moved to Sagan Tosu. Although he played many matches as center back in 2012, his opportunity to play decreased year by year from 2013. He retired end of 2016 season.

Club statistics

References

External links

1979 births
Living people
Komazawa University alumni
Association football people from Ibaraki Prefecture
Japanese footballers
J1 League players
J2 League players
JEF United Chiba players
Montedio Yamagata players
Vissel Kobe players
Ventforet Kofu players
Sagan Tosu players
Association football defenders